The Democratic Progressive Party is a political party in Taiwan founded in 1986. 

Democratic Progressive Party may also refer to:

 Democratic Progressive Party (Argentina), founded 1914
 Democratic Progressive Party (Austria), 1965–1966
 Democratic Progressive Party of Hong Kong, a localist group founded 2015
 Democratic Party (Japan, 2016), 2016–17, sometimes referred to as "Democratic Progressive Party" due to its official Japanese name
 Democratic Progressive Party (Malawi), founded 2005 
 Democratic Progressive Party (Nagaland)
 Democratic Progressive Party (Paraguay), founded 2007
 Sammarinese Democratic Progressive Party, San Marino, 1990–2001
 Democratic Progressive Party (Singapore), founded 1973
 Democratic Progressive Party (Transkei), South Africa, 1981–1986
 Democratic Progressive Party (Spain), created in 1879
 Kurdish Democratic Progressive Party, Syria, founded in 1965

See also
 Progressive Democratic Party (disambiguation)